Mohammad Amin Nuristani (born 1928) is an Afghan field hockey player, who competed at the 1948 Summer Olympic Games and the 1956 Summer Olympic Games. He played in four matches, two in each Olympics.

References

External links
 

1928 births
Possibly living people
Afghan male field hockey players
Field hockey players at the 1948 Summer Olympics
Field hockey players at the 1956 Summer Olympics
Olympic field hockey players of Afghanistan
Place of birth missing (living people)